Haruna Yusif is a Ghanaian former professional footballer. During his playing career he played as a defender specially as a left-back for Kumasi Cornerstones and Kumasi Asante Kotoko. At the international level, he is known for his involvement in the squad that won the 1978 African Cup of Nations and 1982 African Cup of Nations.

Club career 
Yusif played for Kumasi Cornerstones in 1978 before joining Kumasi Asante Kotoko, where he played from 1978 till he retired in 1990.

International career 
Yusif played for the Ghana national team. He key member of the squad that played at the and 1978, 1980 and 1982 African Cup of Nations helping Ghana to make history as the first country to win the competition three times and for keeps during the 1978 edition, after scoring Uganda 2–0 in the finals.

Honours

Club 
Asante Kotoko

 Ghana Premier League:  1980, 1981, 1982, 1983, 1986, 1987, 1988–89
 Ghanaian FA Cup: 1978, 1984
 African Cup of Champions Clubs: 1983

Ghana

 African Cup of Nations: 1978, 1982

Individual 

 Africa Cup of Nations Team of the Tournament: 1982

References

External links 

 
 

Living people
Year of birth missing (living people)
Association football defenders
Ghanaian footballers
Africa Cup of Nations-winning players
1978 African Cup of Nations players
1980 African Cup of Nations players
1982 African Cup of Nations players
1984 African Cup of Nations players
Cornerstones F.C. players
Ghana international footballers
Asante Kotoko S.C. players
Ghana Premier League players